Louis Frederic Austin (L.F. Austin, 1852/4–1905) was a British literary journalist, theatre critic, and long-time secretary to Henry Irving. He was a regular contributor to The Illustrated London News and The Sketch. He also wrote under the pen names Augustin Lewis (in Dublin University Magazine), and Frederic Daly.

Bibliography
1886, Henry Irving in England and America 1838–84
1896, At Random : Essays and Stories
1896, The Astrologer at Large : An Interview with Old Moore, English Illustrated Magazine
1906, Points of View, edited by Clarence Rook

References

British theatre critics
1852 births
1905 deaths